Sipmania is a genus of lichenized fungi within the order Arthoniales. The genus has been placed into the family Roccellaceae. This is a monotypic genus, containing the single species Sipmania peltata.

The genus was circumscribed by José Maria Egea Fernández and P. Torrente in Biblioth. Lichenol. vol.54 on pages 6 and 165 in 1994.

The genus name of Sipmania is in honour of Henricus (Harrie) Johannes Maria Sipman (born 1945) is a Dutch lichenologist. He specialises in tropical and subtropical lichens, and has authored or co-authored more than 250 scientific publications.

References

Roccellaceae
Monotypic Ascomycota genera
Taxa described in 1994